Jordan Stream is a watercourse, about  long, in the American village of Seal Harbor, Maine. It originates at the southern end of Jordan Pond, in the nearby town of Mount Desert, and flows directly south to its mouth at the northern end of Little Long Pond.

The Jordan Stream valley is pre-glacial. It originally drained southeasterly to Seal Harbor but now drains, initially through a bedrock gorge, southwesterly.

References

Mount Desert Island
Rivers of Hancock County, Maine